Nerds FC is an Australian television documentary featuring football. The first series of the show was aired as a lead-in for the 2006 FIFA World Cup on the Special Broadcasting Service network that featured coverage of the Australian national soccer team.

The show follows a football team of 14 nerds who were trained over 3 months, climaxing with a match against a professional team. Nerds FC is produced by SBS independent and Grundy Television (which has now merged with Crackerjack to become FremantleMedia Australia).

Nerds FC's format, FC Nerds, is based on the Danish reality TV hit FC Zulu.

The first series aired on Australian TV from 14 April 2006, encored from 8 June 2006, and encored again from 21 April 2007.
The DVD for the first series was released on 6 June 2007.

The second series aired from 9 June 2007.
The DVD for the second series was released on 16 August 2007.

Episodes
List of Nerds FC episodes

Cast
The team was specifically selected to have little to no knowledge of football, and also little physical ability or aptitude for the game. To find such individuals, ads were placed in local university newspapers and internet chat rooms seeking 18- to 25-year-old men, Could you be described as an intelligent geek? Do you bore your friends with technical, scientific or obsessional details? Grundy Television wants you!

The aim of the program is to build a group of nerds into a side, able to play with reasonable ability against (semi) professional teams, give some nerds a physical challenge, and to make a TV program.

Unlike other reality television series, the team was meant to bond and produce a cohesive group that was capable of excellent results. There is no 'voting off' or winner, or strategic plotting against fellow participants, the team participates as a whole.

Vodcasts
Released shortly after each episode is aired the vodcasts include commentary and extra information from some of the nerds. They can be downloaded from the Australian iTunes Music Store.

Series 1

Squad

Strip
The Nerds FC Season 1 strip was Royal Blue with white piping at the sleeves and neck, with matching shorts and socks.

Training Ground
The Nerds FC training ground is Wentworth Playing Grounds between Glebe and Pyrmont in Sydney, New South Wales.

Song and Video
The third episode saw the Nerds FC team in the 301 recording studio to make its team song, led by professional vocal trainer Erana Clark of Australian Idol fame.

The chorus of the song (and promotional video) is (in rhyme):

"We will enter history,
Failure to victory,
This team is proud to be
Nerds FC."

Watch the Promotional Video.

Games
The first game played by Nerds FC was against the "Young Matildas", the Australia women's national football (soccer) team under 21s football team. The score was 11:0 to the Young Matildas.

The fourth episode had the Nerds FC playing a game against a team of inmates in a prison.  The score was 8:0.

The seventh episode featured a rematch against the Young Matildas.  The score was 5:0.

The final 'professional' outing was against Melbourne Victory in front of 25,000 people as post-match entertainment for the 2006 A-League Semi Final between Adelaide United and Sydney FC.
The score was 12:2.

Cameo appearances
Episode 1: One of the Wiggles gives a "Go Nerds FC" cheer during the credits
Episode 2: Anthony LaPaglia gives a "Go Nerds FC" cheer during the credits
Episode 6: Blue Wiggle, Anthony Field, reveals his same-colour blue Nerds FC jumper underneath his Wiggles shirt and declares himself a fan.

Series 2.0 - Nerds Upgraded

Squad

Strip
The Nerds FC Season 2 strip was yellow with black shoulder and collar stripe, black shorts, socks and shoes.
The goalie wore a grey shirt, grey shorts, socks and shoes. In a radio interview on station 2SSR however, Adam (the Goalie) commented that the grey shoes were due to his large feet, not the goalie strip; and that he would have been wearing those shoes regardless of the position he was given.

Training ground
The training ground for season 2 is the Sydney Academy of Sport in Sydney, New South Wales.

Song and video
The team song for series 2 is a rock version of the previous season's song. The song features Australian Idol finalist Chris Murphy playing guitar and singing some solos and an orchestral backing in the final section of the piece. In addition to this, the rap in the middle is changed to fit with the interests of the series 2 nerds.

Games
In the first episode, the Nerds were taken to the Marconi Stallions ground to play the New South Wales Under 11's Elite Squad. The score was 6:0 to the Under 11's.

In episode three the Nerds played the Nerds FC team from Season 1. The original Nerds team won 3:0.

In episode four, the team was taken to Bluetongue Stadium to face a team of celebrities. The celebrities won 5:2.

In the fifth episode, the Nerds faced off against a team of military servicemen. The score was 2:0 to the military.

Final match
The final match was played on 27 February 2007 with the nerds playing an "International All-Star Team". The venue was Pittwater Park, Warriewood.

The curtain raiser was a match between the Nerds FC Series 1 and the New South Wales Under 11's Elite Squad.

See also

List of Australian television series
List of programs broadcast by Special Broadcasting Service

References

External links
 Nerds FC Home Page
 Trent Apted interview 21 June 2006 - Computerworld.com.au
 Team song for series 2
 Talk To The Nerds Website
 

2000s Australian reality television series
Special Broadcasting Service original programming
Soccer in Australia
Television shows set in New South Wales
2006 Australian television series debuts
2007 Australian television series endings
English-language television shows
Television series by Fremantle (company)
Soccer mass media in Australia
SBS Sport